The 2018 Louisville Cardinals men's soccer team represented University of Louisville during the 2018 NCAA Division I men's soccer season.  The Cardinals were led by head coach Ken Lolla, in his thirteenth season.  They played home games at Lynn Stadium.  This was the team's 40th season playing organized men's college soccer and their 5th playing in the Atlantic Coast Conference.

Background

The 2017 Louisville Cardinals team had a record of 13–2–5 overall and 5–2–1 in the Atlantic Coast Conference. The team received a bye into the quarterfinals of the 2017 ACC Men's Soccer Tournament before losing to Virginia on penalties. The Carindals earned an at-large bid to the 2017 NCAA Division I Men's Soccer Championship, where they were eliminated in the quarterfinals by Akron.

Player movement

Players leaving

Players arriving

Squad

Roster

Updated August 3, 2018

Team management

Source:

Schedule

Source:

|-
!colspan=6 style=""| Exhibition

|-
!colspan=6 style=""| Regular season

|-
!colspan=7 style=""| ACC Tournament

|-
!colspan=6 style=""| NCAA Tournament

Awards and honors

2019 MLS SuperDraft 

Source:

Rankings

References

Louisville Cardinals men's soccer seasons
Louisville Cardinals
Louisville Cardinals
Louisville Cardinals
Louisville
2018